The Scene was a nightclub on West 46th Street, Manhattan, New York City operated by Steve Paul between 1964 and 1969.  It was notable for historic performances by The Doors and Jimi Hendrix, among many others.

History
The Scene, also known as "Steve Paul's The Scene", was located in the basement of 301 West 46th Street, in  New York's Theater District. Steve Paul had started his entertainment career as a publicist for the Peppermint Lounge.  Paul opened the club in 1964, initially as a club for actors, musicians and theatre workers from Broadway.  At the time, the only musician in the club was a resident pianist.  Regular musical acts commenced in 1966.  The shift in focus to musical acts was quite popular, and involved such acts as The Young Rascals, The Lovin' Spoonful, and Sammy Davis, Jr. Blood Sweat and Tears with Al Kooper played some of their earliest gigs there. B B King played there for 2 nights and Jimi Hendrix sat in both nights. It also became a popular club with Andy Warhol and those associated with him, including Edie Sedgwick.

The club's initial popularity waned, resulting in a period of closure until reopened with the assistance, financial and otherwise, of such persons as Peter Yarrow, Allen Ginsberg and Tiger Morse.  In its second incarnation, the club became particularly popular with Jimi Hendrix, who regularly performed there after hours, in jams with other notable musicians. The first New York performances of the Jimi Hendrix Experience were at The Scene, on June 3 and 4, 1967, subsequent to Steve Paul seeing the band at the Monterey International Pop Festival.  Other acts featured included The Velvet Underground, Pink Floyd, Jeff Beck, Traffic,  Fleetwood Mac and The Chambers Brothers. Admission to the club was strictly controlled by Steve Paul, who was twenty-three years old at the time of the commencement of the club's second incarnation. Other regular attendees included photographer Linda Eastman, who later married Paul McCartney, and Tiny Tim, who often opened the sets.  In 1967, The Doors played for three weeks at The Scene, becoming the biggest draw in the history of the club. Much of the 1970 documentary Groupies was shot in and around The Scene.

The club closed on 12 July 1969. According to Sterling Morrison, of the Velvet Underground, the closure was prompted by Steve Paul's refusal to pay protection money to the New York Mafia.  This resulted in fights being started at the club, placing its liquor license in jeopardy.

References

External links
 Making the (Steve Paul) Scene
 Profile of Steve Paul

1964 establishments in New York City
1964 in New York City
1970 disestablishments in New York (state)
1970 in New York City
1960s in Manhattan
1970s in Manhattan
American companies established in 1964
American companies disestablished in 1970
Entertainment companies disestablished in 1970
Music venues completed in 1964
Nightclubs in Manhattan
Former music venues in New York City